Bruno Gustav Scherwitz (22 June 1896 - 23 October 1985) was a German Nazi Party official who served as the Gauleiter of Gau East Prussia in the Party's early years, and as a Luftwaffe officer in World War II.

Early life
Scherwitz was born in Labiau in East Prussia, the son of a locksmith and factory owner. He was educated in the local volksschule and gymnasium until 1914. On the outbreak of the First World War, he entered military service as a volunteer. He fought with Reserve Infantry Regiment 204, and attained the rank of Leutnant. He was wounded in action and awarded the Iron Cross, 1st and 2nd class. Returning to civilian life after the war, he was employed as a salesman.

Nazi Party career
On 10 September 1925 Scherwitz became a member of the Nazi Party (membership number 18,325). He was a participant in the founding assembly of the Gau East Prussia on 6 December 1925 in Königsberg. 
When the first Gauleiter of East Prussia, Wilhelm Stich, was unable to solve the financial problems of the Gau, he was removed from office. On 1 February 1926, Scherwitz was appointed as the new Gauleiter by Gregor Strasser, who at the time was the chief organizer for the Party in northern Germany.

However, in March 1927 Scherwitz was removed from his post. He was succeeded by Hans Albert Hohnfeldt, the Gauleiter of the neighboring Free City of Danzig, who took over temporarily as acting Gauleiter. Furthermore, on 27 September 1927 Scherwitz was expelled from the Party in a decree issued by Adolf Hitler. This notice of expulsion was published in the Völkische Beobachter on 5 October.

Luftwaffe service
Not much is known of Scherwitz's life until June 1939 when he joined the Luftwaffe with the rank of Hauptmann in the reserves. He served as the commander of Luftwaffe Protection Battalion I on the eastern front. He was promoted to Major on 1 September 1942 shortly before being seriously wounded in the Battle of Stalingrad on the 20th of that month. After recuperating, he was transferred to the army in late 1943 or 1944 but no further details of his life are documented. He died on 23 October 1985.

References

Sources

1896 births
1985 deaths
Gauleiters
Luftwaffe personnel of World War II
Nazi Party officials
People from East Prussia
Recipients of the Iron Cross (1914), 1st class
Recipients of the Iron Cross (1914), 2nd class